The Asr prayer ("afternoon prayer") is one of the five mandatory salah (Islamic prayer). As an Islamic day starts at sunset, the Asr prayer is technically the fifth prayer of the day. If counted from midnight, it is the third prayer of the day.

The Asr prayer consists of four obligatory rakat. An additional four rakat are recommended to be performed before the obligatory rakat. As with Zuhr prayer, if it is performed in congregation, the imam is silent except when announcing the takbir, i'tidal, and taslim.

The period of Asr prayer begins approximately when the sun is halfway down from noon to sunset (various branches of Islam differ on the starting point; some say that it begins when the shadow of an object equals its actual length plus its shadow during noon, others say that the actual length must be doubled). Asr prayer ends at sunset, when Maghrib prayer begins. Muslims are also allowed to perform Zuhr and Asr prayers one after another, so they may perform the Asr prayer before the actual period begins. Barring the Hanafi school, which forbids prayer combination, Sunni Muslims may only do this if they are traveling and incapable of performing the prayers separately. Amongst Sunnis, Salafis allow the combining of prayers for a wide range of reasons such as when various needs or difficulties arise (taking precedence from Hanbali and Shafiite schools).

The Asr daily prayer is mentioned as the middle prayer in the Qur'an at sura 2 (Al-Baqara) and it is emphasized on the Muslims to protect this prayer meaning that it should be performed at all costs, ayat 238. al-Asr is also the title of the 103rd chapter (sura) of the Qur’ān.

The five daily prayers collectively are one pillar of the Five Pillars of Islam, in Sunni Islam, and one of the ten Practices of the Religion (Furū al-Dīn) according to Shia Islam.

Name variations

Format
The Asr prayer consist of four obligatory rakats, along with two or four sunnah rakats preceding it. Although, according to some madh'habs, it may be reduced to two rakaʿāt when travelling.

Ja'fari and Zaydi schools of thought
According to the Ja'fari and Zaydi schools of thought the time period within which the Asr prayer must be recited is the following:

Time begins: once the Dhuhr prayer (mid-day daily prayer) has been recited.
Time ends: at the beginning of the setting of the Sun.

However, it is very important to recite the prayer as soon as the time begins. Letter 52 of Nahj al-Balagha contains instruction of Ali to his governors on the timings of salat, "The Asr prayers can be performed till the sun is still bright and enough time of the day is left for a person to cover a distance of six miles."

Hanafi, Hanbali, Shafi’i, and Maliki schools of thought
The time period within which the Asr prayer must be recited is the following:

Time begins: The Sunni schools differ on when the time begins. The Maliki, Shafi`i, and Hanbali schools say it is at the time when the length of any object's shadow equals the length of the object itself plus the length of that object's shadow at noon. The dominant opinion in the Hanafi school says it begins when the length of any object's shadow is twice the length of the object plus the length of that object's shadow at noon.
Time ends: Once the sun has completely set below the horizon. However, it is frowned upon (and sinful in the Maliki school) to delay the prayer without a legitimate excuse to the point of the day in which the sun turns a pale red or orange color as it begins to set, though it would still be considered to have been prayed on time.

The Islamic prophet Muhammad said, "He who observes Al-Bardayn (i.e., Fajr and ‘Asr prayers) will enter Jannah."

In another hadith:
Muhammad said 'He who misses his Asr Salat (i.e. performs it after its specified time) is as if he had lost his wife, children and all his wealth.’ (Sahih Muslim)

See also
Dhikr
Tasbih
Mincha
Other salah:
Fajr prayer (Morning)
Zuhr prayer (Mid-noon)
Maghrib prayer (Sunset) 
Isha prayer (Night)

References

Salah
Salah terminology